The economy of Africa consists of the trade, industry, agriculture, and human resources of the continent. , approximately 1.3 billion people were living in 54 countries in Africa. Africa is a resource-rich continent. Recent growth has been due to growth in sales, commodities, services, and manufacturing. West Africa, East Africa, Central Africa and Southern Africa in particular, are expected to reach a combined GDP of $29 trillion by 2050.

In March 2013, Africa was identified as the world's poorest inhabited continent; however, the World Bank expects that most African countries will reach "middle income" status (defined as at least US$1,025 per person a year) by 2025 if current growth rates continue.
There are a number of reasons for Africa's poor economy:  historically, even though Africa had a number of empires trading with many parts of the world, many people lived in rural societies; in addition, European colonization and the later Cold War created political, economic and social instability.

However,  Africa was the world's fastest-growing continent at 5.6% a year, and GDP is expected to rise by an average of over 6% a year between 2013 and 2023. In 2017, the African Development Bank reported Africa to be the world's second-fastest growing economy, and estimates that average growth will rebound to 3.4% in 2017, while growth is expected to increase by 4.3% in 2018. Growth has been present throughout the continent, with over one-third of African countries posting 6% or higher growth rates, and another 40% growing between 4% to 6% per year. Several international business observers have also named Africa as the future economic growth engine of the world.

History

For millennia, Africa's economy has been diverse, driven by extensive trade routes that developed between cities and kingdoms. Some trade routes were overland, some involved navigating rivers, still others developed around port cities. Large African empires became wealthy due to their trade networks, for example Ancient Egypt, Nubia, Mali, Ashanti, the Oyo Empire and Ancient Carthage

Some parts of Africa had close trade relationships with Arab kingdoms, and by the time of the Ottoman Empire, Africans had begun converting to Islam in large numbers. This development, along with the economic potential in finding a trade route to the Indian Ocean, brought the Portuguese to sub-Saharan Africa as an imperial force. Colonial interests created new industries to feed European appetites for goods such as palm oil, rubber, cotton, precious metals, spices, cash crops other goods, and integrated especially the coastal areas with the Atlantic economy.

A significant factor on economic development was the gain of human capital by the elite. Between the 14th and 20th century there can be observed that in regions with more elite violence and hence higher chances to die at a younger age the elite did not invest much in education. Therefore their numeracy (as a measure of human capital) tend to be lower than in less safe countries and vice versa. This can explain the difference in economic development between the African regions.

20th century upheaval 
Following the independence of African countries during the 20th century, economic, political and social upheaval consumed much of the continent. An economic rebound among some countries has been evident in recent years, however.

The dawn of the African economic boom (which is in place since the 2000s) has been compared to the Chinese economic boom that had emerged in Asia since late 1970s. In 2013, Africa was home to seven of the world's fastest-growing economies.

As of 2018, Nigeria is the biggest economy in Africa by nominal GDP, followed by South Africa; in terms of PPP, Egypt is second biggest after Nigeria. Equatorial Guinea has Africa's highest GDP per capita. Oil-rich countries such as Algeria, Libya and Gabon, and mineral-rich Botswana have emerged among the top economies since the 21st century, while Zimbabwe and the Democratic Republic of Congo are potentially among the world's richest nations by natural resources, but have sunk into the list of the world's poorest nations due to pervasive political corruption, warfare, end emigration. Botswana stands out for its sustained strong and stable growth since independence.

Current conditions
 The United Nations predicts Africa's economic growth will reach 3.5% in 2018 and 3.7% in 2019. As of 2007, growth in Africa had surpassed that of East Asia. Data suggest parts of the continent are now experiencing fast growth, thanks to their resources and increasing political stability and 'has steadily increased levels of peacefulness since 2007'. The World Bank reports the economy of Sub-Saharan African countries grew at rates that match or surpass global rates. According to the United Nations Department of Economic and Social Affairs, the improvement in the region's aggregate growth is largely attributable to a recovery in Egypt, Nigeria and South Africa, three of Africa's largest economies. 

Sub-Saharan Africa was severely harmed when government revenue declined from 22% of GDP in 2011 to 17% in 2021. 15 African nations hold significant debt risk, and 7 are currently in financial crisis according to the IMF. The region went on to receive IMF Special Drawing Rights of $23 billion in 2021 to assist critical public spending.

The economies of the fastest growing African nations experienced growth significantly above the global average rates. The top nations in 2007 include Mauritania with growth at 19.8%, Angola at 17.6%, Sudan at 9.6%, Mozambique at 7.9% and Malawi at 7.8%. Other fast growers include Rwanda, Mozambique, Chad, Niger, Burkina Faso, Ethiopia. Nonetheless, growth has been dismal, negative or sluggish in many parts of Africa including Zimbabwe, the Democratic Republic of the Congo, the Republic of the Congo and Burundi. Many international agencies are increasingly interested in investing in emerging African economies, especially as Africa continues to maintain high economic growth despite current global economic recession.
The rate of return on investment in Africa is currently the highest in the developing world.

Debt relief is being addressed by some international institutions in the interests of supporting economic development in Africa. In 1996, the UN sponsored the Heavily Indebted Poor Countries (HIPC) initiative, subsequently taken up by the IMF, World Bank and the African Development Fund (AfDF) in the form of the Multilateral Debt Relief Initiative (MDRI). As of 2013, the initiative has given partial debt relief to 30 African countries.

In early 2021, the European Investment Bank, with the help of the Making Finance Work for Africa Partnership (MFW4A), surveyed 78 banks in Sub-Saharan Africa for the EIB Banking in Africa study. The banks that took part control nearly 30% of the continent's assets. Almost two-thirds of Banks surveyed tightened lending rules, but more than 80% expanded their use of restructuring or loan moratoriums. Few banks were required to modify their employee levels, while slightly under one-third adjusted their prices. Approximately half of the answering banks had employee guarantees, the majority of which came from the central bank, the government, or an international financial institution.

Fiscal stimulus packages in African countries through to mid-2020 amounted to roughly 1–2% of GDP, with monetary stimulus amounting to about 2% of GDP. This is close to the IMF's global average for low-income developing nations, which is around 2% of 2020 GDP over a one-year period from the start of the COVID-19 pandemic. At the same time, developing markets adopted a package worth around 4% of GDP, whereas advanced countries executed a package worth approximately 16% of GDP. As African nations struggled to address the health and economic repercussions of the pandemic, the average fiscal deficit throughout Africa increased from 5% of GDP in 2019 to over 8% in 2020. Due to a lack of fiscal headroom, the deficit resulted in increasing borrowing, which African countries have less capacity to absorb than other developed economies.

Northern and Southern African countries have taken the most total measures to address the financial sector crisis resulting from the pandemic, with an average of 14 measures per country. 34 African nations have adopted steps to increase liquidity and lower borrowing costs, mostly through lowering the policy rate. South Africa, for example, has decreased policy rates by 200 basis points or more. The most used measure has been to modify the handling of nonperforming loans by lowering provisioning requirements. To help banks get through the COVID-19 crisis, authorities have limited dividends or other uses of earnings, permitted the temporary release of capital buffers, eased capital or liquidity requirements, or made other temporary adjustments to prudential standards. Despite the COVID-19 pandemic, African private investment was steady in 2020, rising to $4.3 billion from $3.9 billion in 2019 as pipeline and current transactions were closed. For resource-intensive nations, real per capita GDP is anticipated to stay below pre-pandemic levels until at least 2024, with growth of barely 1% per year in 2022 and 2023. Before the pandemic, 2% or more of growth had been anticipated.

Trade growth
Trade has driven much of the growth in Africa's economy in the early 21st century. China and India are increasingly important trade partners; 12.5% of Africa's exports are to China, and 4% are to India, which accounts for 5% of China's imports and 8% of India's. The Group of Five (Indonesia, Malaysia, Saudi Arabia, Thailand, and the United Arab Emirates) are another increasingly important market for Africa's exports.

Future

Africa's economy—with expanding trade, English language skills (official in many Sub-Saharan countries), improving literacy and education, availability of splendid resources and cheaper labour force—is expected to continue to perform better into the future. Trade between Africa and China stood at US$166 billion in 2011.

Africa will only experience a "demographic dividend" by 2035, when its young and growing labour force will have fewer children and retired people as dependents as a proportion of the population, making it more demographically comparable to the US and Europe. It is becoming a more educated labour force, with nearly half expected to have some secondary-level education by 2020. A consumer class is also emerging in Africa and is expected to keep booming. Africa has around 90 million people with household incomes exceeding $5,000, meaning that they can direct more than half of their income towards discretionary spending rather than necessities. This number could reach a projected 128 million by 2020.

During the President of the United States Barack Obama's visit to Africa in July 2013, he announced a US$7 billion plan to further develop infrastructure and work more intensively with African heads of state. A new program named Trade Africa, designed to boost trade within the continent as well as between Africa and the U.S., was also unveiled by Obama.

With the introduction of the new economic growth and development plan introduced by the African Union members about 27 of its members who average some of the most developing economies of the continent will further boost economic social and political integration of the continent. The African Continental Free Trade Area will boost business activities between member states and within the continent. This will further reduce too much reliance on importation of finished products and raw materials in to the continent.

The gap between rich and poor countries is predicted to continue to grow over the coming decades.

Entrepreneurship 
Entrepreneurship is a key to growth. Governments will need to ensure business friendly regulatory environments in order to help foster innovation. In 2019, venture capital startup funding grew to 1.3 billion dollars, increasing rapidly. The causes are as of yet unclear, but education is certainly a factor.

Causes of the economic underdevelopment over the years
The seemingly intractable nature of Africa's poverty has led to debate concerning its root causes. Endemic warfare and unrest, widespread corruption, and despotic regimes are both causes and effects of the continued economic problems. The decolonization of Africa was fraught with instability aggravated by cold war conflict. Since the mid-20th century, the Cold War and increased corruption, poor governance, disease and despotism have also contributed to Africa's poor economy.

According to The Economist, the most important factors are government corruption, political instability, socialist economics, and protectionist trade policy.

Infrastructure 

According to the researchers at the Overseas Development Institute, the lack of infrastructure in many developing countries represents one of the most significant limitations to economic growth and achievement of the Millennium Development Goals (MDGs). Infrastructure investments and maintenance can be very expensive, especially in such areas as landlocked, rural and sparsely populated countries in Africa.

It has been argued that infrastructure investments contributed to more than half of Africa's improved growth performance between 1990 and 2005 and increased investment is necessary to maintain growth and tackle poverty. The returns to investment in infrastructure are very significant, with on average 30–40% returns for telecommunications (ICT) investments, over 40% for electricity generation, and 80% for roads.

In Africa, it is argued that to meet the MDGs by 2015, infrastructure investments would need to reach about 15% of GDP (around $93 billion a year). Currently, the source of financing varies significantly across sectors. Some sectors are dominated by state spending, others by overseas development aid (ODA) and yet others by private investors. In sub-Saharan Africa, the state spends around $9.4 billion out of a total of $24.9 billion.

In irrigation, SSA states represent almost all spending; in transport and energy a majority of investment is state spending; in Information and communication technologies and water supply and sanitation, the private sector represents the majority of capital expenditure. Overall, aid, the private sector and non-OECD financiers between them exceed state spending. The private sector spending alone equals state capital expenditure, though the majority is focused on ICT infrastructure investments. External financing increased from $7 billion (2002) to $27 billion (2009). China, in particular, has emerged as an important investor.

Colonialism

The principal aim of colonial rule in Africa by European colonial powers was to exploit natural wealth in the African continent at a low cost. Some writers, such as Walter Rodney in his book How Europe Underdeveloped Africa, argue that these colonial policies are directly responsible for many of Africa's modern problems. Critics of colonialism charge colonial rule with injuring African pride, self-worth and belief in themselves. Other post-colonial scholars, most notably Frantz Fanon continuing along this line, have argued that the true effects of colonialism are psychological and that domination by a foreign power creates a lasting sense of inferiority and subjugation that creates a barrier to growth and innovation. Such arguments posit that a new generation of Africans free of colonial thought and mindset is emerging and that this is driving economic transformation.

Historians L. H. Gann and Peter Duignan have argued that Africa probably benefited from colonialism on balance. Although it had its faults, colonialism was probably "one of the most efficacious engines for cultural diffusion in world history". These views, however, are controversial and are rejected by some who, on balance, see colonialism as bad. The economic historian David Kenneth Fieldhouse has taken a kind of middle position, arguing that the effects of colonialism were actually limited and their main weakness wasn't in deliberate underdevelopment but in what it failed to do. Niall Ferguson agrees with his last point, arguing that colonialism's main weaknesses were sins of omission. Analysis of the economies of African states finds that independent states such as Liberia and Ethiopia did not have better economic performance than their post-colonial counterparts. In particular the economic performance of former British colonies was better than both independent states and former French colonies.

Africa's relative poverty predates colonialism. Jared Diamond argues in Guns, Germs, and Steel that Africa has always been poor due to a number of ecological factors affecting historical development. These factors include low population density, lack of domesticated livestock and plants and the north–south orientation of Africa's geography. However Diamond's theories have been criticized by some including James Morris Blaut as a form of environmental determinism. Historian John K. Thornton argues that sub-Saharan Africa was relatively wealthy and technologically advanced until at least the seventeenth century. Some scholars who believe that Africa was generally poorer than the rest of the world throughout its history make exceptions for certain parts of Africa. Acemoglue and Robinson, for example, argue that most of Africa has always been relatively poor, but "Aksum, Ghana, Songhay, Mali, [and] Great Zimbabwe ... were probably as developed as their contemporaries anywhere in the world." A number of people including Rodney and Joseph E. Inikori have argued that the poverty of Africa at the onset of the colonial period was principally due to the demographic loss associated with the slave trade as well as other related societal shifts. Others such as J. D. Fage and David Eltis have rejected this view.

Language diversity

African countries suffer from communication difficulties caused by language diversity. Greenberg's diversity index is the chance that two randomly selected people would have different mother tongues. Out of the most diverse 25 countries according to this index, 18 (72%) are African. This includes 12 countries for which Greenberg's diversity index exceeds 0.9, meaning that a pair of randomly selected people will have less than 10% chance of having the same mother tongue. However, the primary language of government, political debate, academic discourse, and administration is often the language of the former colonial powers; English, French, or Portuguese.

Trade-based theories 
Dependency theory asserts that the wealth and prosperity of the superpowers and their allies in Europe, North America and East Asia is dependent upon the poverty of the rest of the world, including Africa. Economists who subscribe to this theory believe that poorer regions must break their trading ties with the developed world in order to prosper.

Less radical theories suggest that economic protectionism in developed countries hampers Africa's growth. When developing countries have harvested agricultural produce at low cost, they generally do not export as much as would be expected. Abundant farm subsidies and high import tariffs in the developed world, most notably those set by Japan, the European Union's Common Agricultural Policy, and the United States Department of Agriculture, are thought to be the cause. Although these subsidies and tariffs have been gradually reduced, they remain high.

Local conditions also affect exports; state over-regulation in several African nations can prevent their own exports from becoming competitive. Research in Public Choice economics such as that of Jane Shaw suggest that protectionism operates in tandem with heavy State intervention combining to depress economic development. Farmers subject to import and export restrictions cater to localized markets, exposing them to higher market volatility and fewer opportunities. When subject to uncertain market conditions, farmers press for governmental intervention to suppress competition in their markets, resulting in competition being driven out of the market. As competition is driven out of the market, farmers innovate less and grow less food further undermining economic performance.

Governance

Although Africa and Asia had similar levels of income in the 1960s, Asia has since outpaced Africa, with the exception of a few extremely poor and war-torn countries like Afghanistan and Yemen. One school of economists argues that Asia's superior economic development lies in local investment. Corruption in Africa consists primarily of extracting economic rent and moving the resulting financial capital overseas instead of investing at home; the stereotype of African dictators with Swiss bank accounts is often accurate. University of Massachusetts Amherst researchers estimate that from 1970 to 1996, capital flight from 30 sub-Saharan countries totalled $187bn, exceeding those nations' external debts. Authors Leonce Ndikumana and James K. Boyce estimate that from 1970 to 2008, capital flight from 33 sub-Saharan countries totalled $700bn. This disparity in development is consistent with the model theorized by economist Mancur Olson. Because governments were politically unstable and new governments often confiscated their predecessors' assets, officials would stash their wealth abroad, out of reach of any future expropriation.

Congolese dictator Mobutu Sese Seko became notorious for corruption, nepotism, and the embezzlement of between US$4 billion and $15 billion during his reign. Socialist governments influenced by Marxism, and the land reform they have enacted, have also contributed to economic stagnation in Africa. For example, the regime of Robert Mugabe in Zimbabwe, particularly the land seizures from white farmers, led to the collapse of the country's agricultural economy, which had formerly been one of Africa's strongest; Mugabe had been previously supported by the USSR and China during the Zimbabwe War of Liberation. Tanzania was left as one of the world's poorest and most aid-dependent nations, and has taken decades to recover. Since the abolition of the socialist one-party state in 1992 and the transition to democracy, Tanzania has experienced rapid economic growth, with growth of 6.5% in 2017.

Foreign aid
Food shipments in case of dire local shortage are generally uncontroversial; but as Amartya Sen has shown, most famines involve a local lack of income rather than of food. In such situations, food aid—as opposed to financial aid—has the effect of destroying local agriculture and serves mainly to benefit Western agribusiness which are vastly overproducing food as a result of agricultural subsidies.

Historically, food aid is more highly correlated with excess supply in Western countries than with the needs of developing countries. Foreign aid has been an integral part of African economic development since the 1980s.

The aid model has been criticized for supplanting trade initiatives. Growing evidence shows that foreign aid has made the continent poorer. One of the biggest critics of the aid development model is economist Dambisa Moyo (a Zambian economist based in the US), who introduced the Dead Aid model, which highlights how foreign aid has been a deterrent for local development.

Today, Africa faces the problem of attracting foreign aid in areas where there is potential for high income from demand. It is in need of more economic policies and active participation in the world economy. As globalization has heightened the competition for foreign aid among developing countries, Africa has been trying to improve its struggle to receive foreign aid by taking more responsibility at the regional and international level. In addition, Africa has created the ‘Africa Action Plan’ in order to obtain new relationships with development partners to share responsibilities regarding discovering ways to receive aid from foreign investors.

Trade blocs and multilateral organizations
The African Union is the largest international economic grouping on the continent.  The confederation's goals include the creation of a free trade area, a customs union, a single market, a central bank, and a common currency (see African Monetary Union), thereby establishing economic and monetary union.  The current plan is to establish an African Economic Community with a single currency by 2023. The African Investment Bank is meant to stimulate development.  The AU plans also include a transitional African Monetary Fund leading to an African Central Bank.  Some parties support development of an even more unified United States of Africa.

International monetary and banking unions include:
 Central Bank of West African States
 Bank of Central African States
 Common Monetary Area
Major economic unions are shown in the chart below.

Regional economic organizations
During the 1960s, Ghanaian politician Kwame Nkrumah promoted economic and political union of African countries, with the goal of independence. Since then, objectives, and organizations, have multiplied. Recent decades have brought efforts at various degrees of regional economic integration. Trade between African states accounts for only 11% of Africa's total commerce as of 2012, around five times less than in Asia. Most of this intra-Africa trade originates from South Africa and most of the trade exports coming out of South Africa goes to abutting countries in Southern Africa.

There are currently eight regional organizations that assist with economic development in Africa:

Economic variants and indicators

After an initial rebound from the 2009 world economic crisis, Africa's economy was undermined in the year 2011 by the Arab uprisings. The continent's growth fell back from 5% in 2010 to 3.4% in 2011. With the recovery of North African economies and sustained improvement in other regions, growth across the continent is expected to accelerate to 4.5% in 2012 and 4.8% in 2013. Short-term problems for the world economy remain as Europe confronts its debt crisis. Commodity prices—crucial for Africa—have declined from their peak due to weaker demand and increased supply, and some could fall further. But prices are expected to remain at levels favourable for African exporter.

Regions 
Economic activity has rebounded across Africa. However, the pace of recovery was uneven among groups of countries and subregions. Oil-exporting countries generally expanded more strongly than oil-importing countries. West Africa and East Africa were the two best-performing subregions in 2010.

Intra-African trade has been slowed by protectionist policies among countries and regions, and remains low at 17 percent, compared to Europe, where intra-regional trade is at 69 percent. Despite this, trade between countries belonging to the Common Market for Eastern and Southern Africa (COMESA), a particularly strong economic region, grew six-fold over the past decade up to 2012. Ghana and Kenya, for example, have developed markets within the region for construction materials, machinery, and finished products, quite different from the mining and agriculture products that make up the bulk of their international exports.

The African Ministers of Trade agreed in 2010 to create a Pan-Africa Free Trade Zone. This would reduce countries' tariffs on imports and increase intra-African trade, and it is hoped, the diversification of the economy overall.

African nations

Economic sectors and industries
Because Africa's export portfolio remains predominantly based on raw material, its export earnings are contingent on commodity price fluctuations. This exacerbates the continent's susceptibility to external shocks and bolsters the need for export diversification. Trade in services, mainly travel and tourism, continued to rise in year 2012, underscoring the continent's strong potential in this sphere.

Agriculture

The situation whereby African nations export crops to the West while millions on the continent starve has been blamed on the economic policies of the developed countries. These advanced nations protect their own agricultural sectors with high import tariffs and offer government subsidies to their farmers. which many contend leads the overproduction of such commodities as grain, cotton and milk. The impact of agricultural subsidies in developed countries upon developing-country farmers and international development is well documented. Agricultural subsidies can help drive prices down to benefit consumers, but also mean that unsubsidised developing-country farmers have a more difficult time competing in the world market; and the effects on poverty are particularly negative when subsidies are provided for crops that are also grown in developing countries since developing-country farmers must then compete directly with subsidised developed-country farmers, for example in cotton and sugar. The IFPRI has estimated in 2003 that the impact of subsidies costs developing countries $24 billion in lost incomes going to agricultural and agro-industrial production; and more than $40Bn is displaced from net agricultural exports. The result of this is that the global price of such products is continually reduced until Africans are unable to compete, except for cash crops that do not grow easily in a northern climate.

In recent years countries such as Brazil, which has experienced progress in agricultural production, have agreed to share technology with Africa to increase agricultural production in the continent to make it a more viable trade partner. Increased investment in African agricultural technology in general has the potential to reduce poverty in Africa. The demand market for African cocoa has experienced a price boom in 2008. The Nigerian, South African and Ugandan governments have targeted policies to take advantage of the increased demand for certain agricultural products and plan to stimulate agricultural sectors. The African Union has plans to heavily invest in African agriculture and the situation is closely monitored by the UN.

Ticks are a constant pressure on the continent's livestock. Although acaricides have been commonly used by farmers here, they are becoming less effective. Tick vaccines are under development and may fill this void.

Energy

Africa has significant resources for generating energy in several forms (hydroelectric, reserves of petroleum and gas, coal production, uranium production, renewable energy such as solar, wind and geothermal). The lack of development and infrastructure means that little of this potential is actually in use today. The largest consumers of electric power in Africa are South Africa, Libya, Namibia, Egypt, Tunisia, and Zimbabwe, which each consume between 1000 and 5000 KWh/m2 per person, in contrast with African states such as Ethiopia, Eritrea, and Tanzania, where electricity consumption per person is negligible.

Petroleum and petroleum products are the main export of 14 African countries. Petroleum and petroleum products accounted for a 46.6% share of Africa's total exports in 2010; the second largest export of Africa as a whole is natural gas, in its gaseous state and as liquified natural gas, accounting for a 6.3% share of Africa's exports. Only South Africa is using nuclear power commercially.

Infrastructure

Lack of infrastructure creates barriers for African businesses. Although it has many ports, a lack of supporting transportation infrastructure adds 30–40% to costs, in contrast to Asian ports.

Railway projects were important in mining districts from the late 19th century. Large railway and road projects characterize the late 19th century.  Railroads were emphasized in the colonial era, and roads in 'post-colonial' times.  Jedwab & Storeygard find that in 1960–2015 there were strong correlations between transportation investments and economic development. Influential political include pre-colonial centralization, ethnic fractionalization, European settlement, natural resource dependence, and democracy.

Many large infrastructure projects are underway across Africa. By far, most of these projects are in the production and transportation of electric power. Many other projects include paved highways, railways, airports, and other construction.

Telecommunications infrastructure is also a growth area in Africa. Although Internet penetration lags other continents, it has still reached 9%. As of 2011, it was estimated that 500,000,000 mobile phones of all types were in use in Africa, including 15,000,000 "smart phones".

Mining and drilling

The mineral industry of Africa is one of the largest mineral industries in the world. Africa is the second biggest continent, with 30 million km2 of land, which implies large quantities of resources. For many African countries, mineral exploration and production constitute significant parts of their economies and remain keys to future economic growth. Africa is richly endowed with mineral reserves and ranks first or second in quantity of world reserves of bauxite, cobalt, industrial diamond, phosphate rock, platinum-group metals (PGM), vermiculite, and zirconium.

African mineral reserves rank first or second for bauxite, cobalt, diamonds, phosphate rocks, platinum-group metals (PGM), vermiculite, and zirconium. Many other minerals are also present in quantity. The 2005 share of world production from African soil is the following: bauxite 9%; aluminium 5%; chromite 44%; cobalt 57%; copper 5%; gold 21%; iron ore 4%; steel 2%; lead (Pb) 3%; manganese 39%; zinc 2%; cement 4%; natural diamond 46%; graphite 2%; phosphate rock 31%; coal 5%; mineral fuels (including coal) & petroleum 13%; uranium 16%.

Manufacturing

Both the African Union and the United Nations have outlined plans in modern years on how Africa can help itself industrialize and develop significant manufacturing sectors to levels proportional to the African economy in the 1960s with 21st-century technology. This focus on growth and diversification of manufacturing and industrial production, as well as diversification of agricultural production, has fueled hopes that the 21st century will prove to be a century of economic and technological growth for Africa. This hope, coupled with the rise of new leaders in Africa in the future, inspired the term "the African Century", referring to the 21st century potentially being the century when Africa's vast untapped labor, capital, and resource potentials might become a world player.
This hope in manufacturing and industry is helped by the boom in communications technology and local mining industry in much of sub-Saharan Africa. Namibia has attracted industrial investments in recent years and South Africa has begun offering tax incentives to attract foreign direct investment projects in manufacturing.

Countries such as Mauritius have plans for developing new "green technology" for manufacturing. Developments such as this have huge potential to open new markets for African countries as the demand for alternative "green" and clean technology is predicted to soar in the future as global oil reserves dry up and fossil fuel-based technology becomes less economically viable.

Nigeria in recent years has been embracing industrialization, It currently has an indigenous vehicle manufacturing company, Innoson Vehicle Manufacturing (IVM) which manufactures Rapid Transit Buses, Trucks and SUVs with an upcoming introduction of Cars. Their various brands of vehicle are currently available in Nigeria, Ghana and other West African Nations. Nigeria also has few Electronic manufacturers like Zinox, the first Branded Nigerian Computer and Electronic gadgets (like tablet PCs) manufacturers. In 2013, Nigeria introduced a policy regarding import duty on vehicles to encourage local manufacturing companies in the country. In this regard, some foreign vehicle manufacturing companies like Nissan have made known their plans to have manufacturing plants in Nigeria. Apart from Electronics and vehicles, most consumer, pharmaceutical and cosmetic products, building materials, textiles, home tools, plastics and so on are also manufactured in the country and exported to other west African and African countries. Nigeria is currently the largest manufacturer of cement in Sub-saharan Africa. and Dangote Cement Factory, Obajana is the largest cement factory in sub-saharan Africa. Ogun is considered to be Nigeria's industrial hub (as most factories are located in Ogun and even more companies are moving there), followed by Lagos.

The manufacturing sector is small but growing in East Africa. The main industries are textile and clothing, leather processing, agribusiness, chemical products, electronics and vehicles. East African countries like Uganda also produce motorcycles for the domestic market.

Investment and banking

Africa's US$107 billion financial services industry will log impressive growth for the rest of the decade as more banks target the continent's emerging middle class. The banking sector has been experiencing record growth, among others due to various technological innovations.

China and India have showed increasing interest in emerging African economies in the 21st century. Reciprocal investment between Africa and China increased dramatically in recent years amidst the current world financial crisis.

The increased investment in Africa by China has attracted the attention of the European Union and has provoked talks of competitive investment by the EU. Members of the African diaspora abroad, especially in the EU and the United States, have increased efforts to use their businesses to invest in Africa and encourage African investment abroad in the European economy.

Remittances from the African diaspora and rising interest in investment from the West will be especially helpful for Africa's least developed and most devastated economies, such as Burundi, Togo and Comoros. However, experts lament the high fees involved in sending remittances to Africa due to a duopoly of Western Union and MoneyGram that is controlling Africa's remittance market, making Africa is the most expensive cash transfer market in the world. According to some experts, the high processing fees involved in sending money to Africa are hampering African countries' development.

Angola has announced interests in investing in the EU, Portugal in particular. South Africa has attracted increasing attention from the United States as a new frontier of investment in manufacture, financial markets and small business, as has Liberia in recent years under their new leadership.

There are two African currency unions: the West African Banque Centrale des États de l'Afrique de l'Ouest (BCEAO) and the Central African Banque des États de l'Afrique Centrale (BEAC). Both use the CFA franc as their legal tender. The idea of a single currency union across Africa has been floated, and plans exist to have it established by 2020, though many issues, such as bringing continental inflation rates below 5 percent, remain hurdles in its finalization.

Stock exchanges

As of 2012, Africa has 23 stock exchanges, twice as many as it had 20 years earlier. Nonetheless, African stock exchanges still account for less than 1% of the world's stock exchange activity. The top ten stock exchanges in Africa by stock capital are (amounts are given in billions of United States dollars):

 South Africa (82.88)(2014)
 Egypt ($73.04 billion (30 November 2014 est.))
 Morocco (5.18)
 Nigeria (5.11) (Actually has a market capitalisation value of $39.27 Bln)
 Kenya (1.33)
 Tunisia (0.88)
 BRVM (regional stock exchange whose members include Benin, Burkina Faso, Guinea-Bissau, Ivory Coast, Mali, Niger, Senegal and Togo: 6.6)
 Mauritius (0.55)
 Botswana (0.43)
 Ghana (.38)

Between 2009 and 2012, a total of 72 companies were launched on the stock exchanges of 13 African countries.

See also 

 United Nations Economic Commission for Africa
 Africa–China economic relations
 African Economic Community
 African Economic Outlook
 Demographics of Africa
 Economic history of Africa
 Land grabbing
 Languages of Africa
 List of countries by percentage of population living in poverty
 List of countries by Human Development Index
 Central banks and currencies of Africa
 List of countries by credit rating
 List of countries by future gross government debt
 List of countries by public debt
 List of countries by leading trade partners
 List of countries by industrial production growth rate
 List of countries by GDP (nominal)
 List of countries by GDP (nominal) per capita
 List of countries by GDP (PPP)
 List of countries by GDP (PPP) per capita
 List of countries by GNI (nominal) per capita
 List of countries by tax revenue as percentage of GDP
 List of countries by GDP growth

Citations

General and cited references 

 Fage, J. D. A History of Africa (Routledge, 4th edition, 2001 ) (Hutchinson, 1978) (Knopf 1st American edition, 1978)
 
 Kayizzi-Mugerwa, Steve The African Economy: Policy, Institutions and the Future (Routledge, 1999)
 Laouisset, Djamel (2009). A Retrospective Study of the Algerian Iron and Steel Industry. New York City: Nova Publishers. 
 Moshomba, Richard E.  Africa in the Global Economy (Lynne Rienner, 2000)
 OECD. African Economic Outlook 2006/2007 (OECD, 2007)
 Rodney, Walter. How Europe Underdeveloped Africa. (Washington: Howard UP, 1982)
 Sahn, David E., Paul A. Dorosh, Stephen D. Younger, Structural Adjustment Reconsidered: Economic Policy and Poverty in Africa (Cambridge University Press, 1997)

External links

 
 The Age of the Dragon: China's Conquest of Africa
 Holding the door open for multinationals to extract Africa's wealth, Foreign Policy in Focus
 Africa in the World Economy: the national, regional and international challenges  by Jan Joost Teunissen and Age Akkerman
 Africa: Living on the Fringe,  Monthly Review. Samir Amin offers a Marxist analysis of Africa's continued economic crisis
 BBC: Africa's Economy
 OECD work on African economy
 Africa Economic Analysis
 World Economic Forum – Africa
 African Development Bank Group
 IMF World Economic Outlook (WEO) – September 2003 – Public Debt in Emerging Markets
 Language and Africa
 Africa's economy: A glimmer of light at last? – The Economist
 Africa and the Knowledge Economy – World Bank Institute report.
 Economic analysis of Middle Africa
 From Aid to Trade with Africa News and analysis by Inter Press Service
 African Development Hindered by Vast US Corporate Interests in Continent’s Resources – video report by Democracy Now!
 Africa: Going Forward or Backward? from the Dean Peter Krogh Foreign Affairs Digital Archives

 
Africa